James "Nikki" Rowe High School is one of three high schools and the only T. E. A. recognized high school serving the McAllen, Texas area as a part of the McAllen Independent School District. It houses over 4,200 students from grades 9–12. The school originally opened in 1990, its current location is 2101 North Ware Road McAllen, Texas, United States. The school colors are green and gold and the mascot is the warrior. All athletic teams compete in the UIL District 30-6A.

The school was named after James Nicholas "Nikki" Rowe (1938–1989), who was born in McAllen, Texas to Lee Delavan and Florence (Survillo) Rowe. He grew up in McAllen and graduated from McAllen High School in 1956 before leaving for the United States Military Academy at West Point, New York. Rowe graduated from West Point in 1960 and became a United States Army officer and later one of only thirty-four American prisoners of war to escape captivity during the Vietnam War.

Nikki Rowe High School was the newest addition to the McAllen Independent School District. Nikki Rowe High School was established in 1990 as a ninth grade center, and in 1992 became a class 5A high school. Rowe High School courses include: Advanced Placement, Honors Courses, College Preparatory Courses, and regular level courses. Nikki Rowe High School was the first in McAllen to establish the ACE program—A Chance to Excel. Rowe also offers the Quest program—a search for success, and Project Stay in School. In, 2010 Nikki Rowe High School was officially recognized by Texas Education Agency, for surpassing state mandate requirement as a 30 5A District campus.

Sports 
 Football
 Volleyball
 Cross-Country
 Basketball
 Wrestling
 Soccer
 Swimming
 Tennis
 Softball
 Golf
 Track & Field
 Baseball
 Marching Band

University Interscholastic League 
 Accounting
 Calculator Application
 Computer Application
 Computer Science
 Current Events
 Editorial Writing
 Feature Writing
 Headline Writing
 Literary Criticism
 Mathematics
 News Writing
 Number Sense
 Ready Writing
 Science
 Social Studies
 Spelling
 CX Debate
 Lincoln-Douglas Debate
 Informative Speaking
 Persuasive Speaking
 Poetry Interpretation
 Prose Interpretation
 One-Act

Feeder patterns
Rowe High's feeder schools include:
 Alvarez, Castañeda, Garza, Hendricks (formerly Fifth Elementary School), McAuliffe, Perez (partial, formerly North East), Sanchez (partial, formerly North West) Seguin, and Thigpen-Zavala (partial) elementary schools
 De Leon, Fossum (partial), and Travis middle schools

References

External links 
 Rowe High School
 Rowe: About our school
 Nikki Rowe Library
 James Rowe

1990 establishments in Texas
Educational institutions established in 1990
McAllen Independent School District high schools
Education in McAllen, Texas